The  is an inactive professional wrestling championship in the Japanese promotion DDT Pro-Wrestling. The title was established in 2006. Contestants for the title usually wore gear and used entrance themes inspired by Pride Fighting Championship. They also integrated the word "jet" in their ring name.

Title history

See also

DDT Pro-Wrestling
Professional wrestling in Japan

References

DDT Pro-Wrestling championships
World professional wrestling championships